The Ceram fruit bat or Seram flying fox (Pteropus ocularis) is a species of megabat in the family Pteropodidae. It is endemic to the mountainous forests of two Maluku islands, Buru and Seram, including the Manusela National Park on Seram. They were once present on the nearby Ambon Island, but probably not anymore. The habitat has an area of less than 20,000 km2, and is decreasing due to logging. For this reason, and because of hunting by the local population, these species are listed as vulnerable by the IUCN since 1996.

Ecological Role
The Ceram fruit bat plays an important ecological role in the areas they inhabit because they act as seeds and pollen dispensers. They have been recorded interacting with 59% of forest tree species that provide an abundance of resources.

References 

Pteropus
Bats of Indonesia
Endemic fauna of Indonesia
Endemic fauna of Seram Island
Fauna of Buru
Vulnerable fauna of Asia
Vulnerable fauna of Oceania
Mammals described in 1867
Taxonomy articles created by Polbot
Taxa named by Wilhelm Peters